A masonry arch may refer to:
Triumphal arch, an architectural monument containing an arch, built from any variety of stone
Arch bridge, a bridge constructed of masonry for pedestrian and / or vehicular traffic